Nikoloz Togonidze (born 24 April 1971) is a former Soviet and Georgian footballer.

Career
Togonidze started his career at Metallurg Rustavi.

International career
Togonidze made his Georgia debut on 8 May 1996, replacing Irakli Zoidze in 22 minutes. Togonidze became a regular since September 1997, but later compete with Davit Gvaramadze, made his senior team career end at 1999.

External links

1971 births
Living people
Soviet footballers
Footballers from Georgia (country)
Expatriate footballers from Georgia (country)
Georgia (country) international footballers
Expatriate footballers in Russia
Expatriate footballers in Ukraine
FC Tom Tomsk players
FC Spartak Ivano-Frankivsk players
Association football goalkeepers
FC Torpedo Kutaisi players
FC Dinamo Batumi players